Kazimieras Viktoras Banaitis (3 May 1886 - 25 December 1963 in Brooklyn) was a Lithuanian composer.

Selected works
Jūratė ir Kastytis, opera (1955)

Recordings
Sonata rapsodica (34' min.) David Geringas (cello), Petras Geniušas (piano) 2015

References
 

1886 births
1963 deaths